Erol Otus is an American artist and game designer, known internationally for his contributions to the fantasy role-playing game (RPG) genre, especially early in the Dungeons & Dragons franchise. He is also known for his artwork on the multiple award winning Star Control II as well as providing the voice for one of the character races, the Chmmr, in the same game.

Biography
A self-taught artist since childhood, Otus developed an interest in role-playing games and became employed in the art department of game company TSR in Lake Geneva, Wisconsin in the 1970s. After leaving the company, he studied painting at UC Berkeley and also took classes at the Academy of Art in San Francisco. He has cited a wide range of influences on his work from Dr. Seuss and Frank Frazetta to modern artists such as Joan Miró, Willem de Kooning and Wassily Kandinsky.

Role-playing games
Erol Otus was a prolific contributor to the early Dungeons & Dragons (D&D) franchise, creating full covers as well as many interior illustrations for TSR materials.  For example, he created the cover for the first version of the D&D manual Deities & Demigods and illustrated the Cthulhu pantheon within. According to fellow contributor Jeff Dee, many of the original versions of this work were lost during a later clean-out of the TSR offices.

Otus has also provided cover art and interior illustrations for Goodman Games, Oracle Games (in particular Alma Mater - The High School RPG) and the Arduin series. His art was featured on the covers of the new HackMaster edition and issue #8 of Fight On!

While working at TSR, Otus was a runner-up in TSR's 4th Invitational AD&D Masters Tournament at Gen Con XIII, a contest to choose the game's best overall dungeon master. He competed against the likes of Lenard Lakofka and first place was taken by Frank Mentzer.

Video games
Otus has also provided illustrations, production design and voice overs for computer games such as The Last Ninja, Star Trek: Generations, Mail Order Monsters and Star Control II. Star Control II was named by IGN as the 17th best game of all time, and by GameSpot as one of the greatest games of all time.

Other work
Otus provided the cover art for the album Down Among The Deadmen (2000) by American heavy metal band Slough Feg (then known as Lord Weird Slough Feg).

Homage

In the Dungeons & Dragons adventure module "A4: In the Dungeons of the Slave Lords", part of the treasure on the slaver ships is a series of paintings by a supposedly famous Drow Artist named "Ool Eurts" (an anagram of Erol Otus).

In the Dungeons & Dragons 2nd Edition Boxed set, "Night Below" an encounter in Book III features a crazed exile Drow named Otyl Erys, another nod to both him and the prior module cited above.

References

External links
 
 
 The Erol Otus Shrine (a fansite)

American game designers
American speculative fiction artists
Arduin artists
Fantasy artists
Game artists
Living people
Role-playing game artists
Science fiction artists
Video game artists
Year of birth missing (living people)